Adithinngithigh is an Australian aboriginal language once spoken in Cape York in Queensland.

There has been some confusion over the name:

However, it is not clear how distinct the two varieties are.

References

Northern Paman languages
Extinct languages of Queensland